Zero Chou (born 24 July 1969) is a Taiwanese director and screenwriter.

Life and career
Chou was born in Keelung, Taiwan in 1969. She earned a B.A. in Philosophy from National Chengchi University in 1992. She worked as a journalist before becoming an indie film director.

She entered into film making because of her attraction to the combination of content and form. She has been heralded as the most talented documentary director in the recent years of Taiwan. She has also received various festival awards around the world for films.

Chou and Hoho Liu are an openly lesbian couple. Chou "is one of the few openly lesbian filmmakers in the world, and the only one in Taiwan," according to AfterEllen. She is currently filming a six-film series called the Six Asian Cities Rainbow Project (亞洲六城彩虹計劃). She is trying to finish as quickly as possible and worries she will go missing while filming, since many of the locations have rules against films presenting LGBT content.

Works

Documentary 
 Looking For The Forgotten Artists 1997, 45 mins
 Artist And His Daughter 1997, 23 mins
 Memories Of The Taiwanese Master 1997, 47 mins
 Yi Shi Zai Hai Xia Zhong ("Lost in the Strait") 1998, 48 mins
 Being Ceased 1998, 60 mins
 Mother And Son 1998, 65 mins
 Democracy Show 1998, 53 mins
 Wanderers' Bay 1998, 60 mins
 Floating Islands 2000, 288 mins
 Before The Radiation 2000, 22 mins
 Headhunting Festival 2000, 54 mins
 Zou Zu Zhan Ji 2000, 56 mins
 Corners 2001, 66 mins
 Poles Extremity 2002, 56 mins
 The Kinmenese Tracks 2003, 64 mins
 Father In The Blacklist 2004, 56 mins

Film
 A Film About The Body 1996, 62 mins
 Splendid Float 2004, 71 mins
 The Road On The Air 2006, 82 mins
 Spider Lilies 2007, 97 mins (Teddy Award, 2007)
 Drifting Flowers 2008, 97 mins
 Wave Breaker 2009, 86 mins
 Ripples of Desire 2012, 110 mins
 The Substitute 2017
 We are Gamily 2017
 Wrath of Desire 2020
 Untold Herstory 2022

Television
The Rise and Fall of Qing Dynasty (滿清十三皇朝) 1987
Gloomy Salad Days (死神少女) 2010
  (因為愛你) 2020

Awards
Corners
 Winner of the 2002 Taipei Film Festival for Best Documentary

Poles Extremity
 Winner of the 2003 Marseille Festival of Documentary Film for Best Documentary

Splendid Float
 Winner of the 2004 Golden Horse Award for Best Make Up and Costume Design
 Winner of the 2004 Golden Horse Award for Best Original Film Song
 Winner of the 2004 Golden Horse Award for Best Taiwanese Film Of The Year
 Winner of the 1st CJ Asia Independent Film Festival for Audience Award

Spider Lilies
 Winner of the 2007 Teddy Award for Best Gay/Lesbian Feature Film at the Berlin Film Festival

See also 
 List of female film and television directors
 List of LGBT films directed by women
 List of lesbian filmmakers

References

Further reading
 

1969 births
Living people
Lesbian artists
LGBT film directors
Women documentary filmmakers
Taiwanese lesbian writers
Taiwanese LGBT screenwriters
Taiwanese documentary film directors
Taiwanese women film directors
People from Keelung
LGBT television directors
Women television directors